The Adamson Act was a United States federal law passed in 1916 that established an eight-hour workday, with additional pay for overtime work, for interstate railroad workers.

History 

The terms that were embodied in the act were negotiated by a committee of the four railroad labor brotherhoods of engineers, firemen, brakemen and conductors, chaired by Austin B. Garretson. Garretson was the respected leader of the conductors' union. He had formerly been a member of the President's Commission on Industrial Relations, investigating the causes of industrial violence.
Congress passed the Act in order to avoid a nationwide strike.

Named for Georgia representative William C. Adamson, this was the first federal law that regulated the hours of workers in private companies. The United States Supreme Court upheld the constitutionality of the Act in 1917.
When the railroads refused to abide by the law while their court challenge to its constitutionality was pending, the railway unions began preparing again to strike. The Supreme Court's decision brought the employers around, however, and they entered into settlement discussions concerning implementation of the law.

The unions' success spurred other railway employees not covered by the Act to press similar demands. Their negotiations were leading to a strike when President Woodrow Wilson, exercising the authority granted by the Army Appropriations Act of 1916, took over operation of the railroads on December 26, 1917. (See United States Railroad Administration.)

Terms
The Act, formerly codified at 45 U.S.C. §§ 65, 66, was repealed in 1996 when it provided:

The language of the Adamson Act is now recodified, with only minor changes, at 49 U.S.C. §§ 28301, 28302.

References

1916 in American law
64th United States Congress
History of labor relations in the United States
United States federal labor legislation
Presidency of Woodrow Wilson
Progressive Era in the United States
1916 in labor relations
United States railroad regulation